Emery is an unincorporated community in Macon County, in the U.S. state of Illinois.

History
A post office called Emery was established in 1879, and remained in operation until 1918. The community has the name of Charles F. Emery, a pioneer settler.

References

Unincorporated communities in Macon County, Illinois